Joe Rullier (born January 28, 1980) is a Canadian professional ice hockey defenceman. He who currently plays for Laval Braves of the Ligue Nord-Américaine de Hockey (LNAH). Rullier was selected by the Los Angeles Kings in the fifth round (133rd overall) of the 1998 NHL Entry Draft.

Prior to turning professional, Rullier played four season for Rimouski Océanic from the 1996–1997 season until 1999-2000.

Rullier played 461 regular-season games in the American Hockey League for the Lowell Lock Monsters, Manchester Monarchs, Hartford Wolf Pack, Manitoba Moose, Portland Pirates, Springfield Falcons, Bridgeport Sound Tigers, and Binghamton Senators. He played the 2009-10 season with HC Slovan Bratislava of the Slovak Extraliga.

Personal life

Rullier is married to Canadian fashion model Cathy Krcevinac. In February 2016, Krcevinac gave birth to their first child.

External links

1980 births
Bakersfield Condors (1998–2015) players
Binghamton Senators players
Bridgeport Sound Tigers players
Canadian ice hockey defencemen
Hartford Wolf Pack players
HC Slovan Bratislava players
HPK players
Jokerit players
EHC Kloten players
Living people
Los Angeles Kings draft picks
Lowell Lock Monsters players
Manchester Monarchs (AHL) players
Manitoba Moose players
Portland Pirates players
Rimouski Océanic players
Ice hockey people from Montreal
Springfield Falcons players
Canadian expatriate ice hockey players in Slovakia
Canadian expatriate ice hockey players in Finland
Canadian expatriate ice hockey players in Switzerland
Canadian expatriate ice hockey players in the United States
Canadian expatriate ice hockey players in Kazakhstan